is a 1946 Technicolor musical film directed by Gregory Ratoff and starring Maureen O'Hara and Dick Haymes.  The film features band leader Harry James and his Orchestra (the Music Makers).  

Betty Grable makes a surprise cameo at the end of the film.  At the time Harry James was married to Betty Grable.

Plot summary

Jimmy Hale, a successful singer, chases Katharine "Kitten" Hilliard, a prim music-school dean who transforms herself into a desirable, sophisticated lady after traveling to the big city. Trumpeter and bandleader Barry Clayton also pursues Katharine.

Cast
 Maureen O'Hara as Katherine 'Kitten' Hilliard
 Dick Haymes as Jimmy Hale
 Harry James as Barry Clayton
 Reginald Gardiner as Herbert Benham
 Richard Gaines as Ralph Wainwright
 Stanley Prager as Jay Dilly
 Betty Grable as Barry's Fan in Taxi
James and Grable were married at the time.

References

External links
 
 
 
 

1946 musical films
1946 films
20th Century Fox films
American musical films
Films directed by Gregory Ratoff
1940s English-language films
1940s American films